Fred Goldbeck (13 February 1902 – 3 October 1981 in Paris) was a French musicologist and conductor of Dutch origin.

Biography 
Born in the Netherlands, Fred Goldbeck moved to France in 1924. He met the pianist Yvonne Lefébure and became her companion before the Second World War. They got married in 1947.

As a conductor, he was first of all a disciple of Mengelberg and Furtwängler. Thus he wrote an important first book: Le parfait chef d'orchestre. Thereafter, he defended the works of contemporary composers such as Busoni and Britten, until Boulez and Xenakis. He also promoted Dutch musicians such as Alphons Diepenbrock, Matthijs Vermeulen and Willem Pijper.

Writings

Monographs 
 
 
 
 
 , foreword by Rémy Stricker.

Articles 
 , 24 p.
  107 p

Publisher 
 , foreword by Henry Prunières

Correspondence 
 
 , translated by Jacques-Gabriel Prod'homme

References

External links 
 Des compositeurs au XXè siècle on Book Node
 Goldbeck, Frederik, 1902-1981 on Library of Congress
 Goldbeck, Fred (1902-1981) on IdRef

1902 births
1981 deaths
20th-century French musicologists
Dutch emigrants to France